Michael C. Barnette is an accomplished diver, author, photographer and founder of the Association of Underwater Explorers.

Background and personal life
Barnette was born on September 1971 in Fredericksburg, VA. In 1989, he graduated from Stafford Senior High School. Then, he attended the University of South Carolina, graduating in 1995 with a degree in Marine Biology. Barnette is married and currently resides in Saint Petersburg, FL.

Career
Barnette works for the NOAA's National Marine Fisheries Service as a marine biologist. His current duties include protecting sea turtles by making sure fishing fleets worldwide are utilizing turtle excluder devices. Barnette was made a fellow of The Explorers Club in March 2009.

Association of Underwater Explorers
Barnette has been actively diving and researching shipwrecks since 1990, resulting in the identification of over 30 wreck sites. In 1996, Barnette founded the Association of Underwater Explorers (AUE), an organization dedicated to expanding understanding of submerged cultural resources.

Expeditions and projects
In 2005 Barnette participated in the recovery of a B-25c Mitchell bomber from Lake Murray (South Carolina), working with divers from AUE, the Rubicon Foundation, and Woodville Karst Plain Project under Explorers Club flag number 103. The recovery effort was headed by Dr. Robert Seigler and supervised by Gary Larkins of the Air Pirates. The project was documented by the History Channel and televised on their show Mega Movers. The plane is now being preserved by the Southern Museum of Flight in Birmingham, Alabama.

A year later, in 2006, Barnette was part of the History Channel's expedition to the  led by explorers John Chatterton and Richie Kohler. Titanic's Achilles Heel was the first documentary to be released from this expedition, on June 17, 2007. The documentary Titanic's Tragic Sister also featured details from this expedition, and first aired on October 14, 2007.

Barnette's recovery of Oculina varicosa from the Gulf of Mexico in 2006 allowed researchers to confirm its existence as a species of concern in abundance in the Gulf. In 2009, Barnette returned to collect coral samples for testing that identified the species as genetically identical to Oculina varicosa found off the eastern coast of Florida.

When the Eagle's Nest cave system needed new guidelines in 2007, Barnette and AUE took on the task of replacing the old line as well as removing unnecessary lines.

In January 2020, Barnette, along with fellow explorers, discovered what they believed to be a 95-year-old ship, the SS Cotopaxi, which had disappeared near the Bermuda Triangle in 1925. The boat had departed from Charleston, South Carolina, carrying 32 passengers and never made it to its final destination, Havana, Cuba. Barnette sought help from historians and researchers to ensure that it was the SS Cotopaxi. In doing so, he learned that the ship had sent a distress signal two days into its voyage from a location that aligns with where the wreckage was found. The discovery was featured on a February episode of Shipwreck Secrets, a Science Channel series. In 2020, he identified the wreck of the Sandra, which was reported lost in the Bermuda Triangle in April 1950; the discovery was featured in the History Channel documentary "History's Greatest Mysteries: Expedition Bermuda Triangle." Barnette has been featured in multiple television documentaries on shipwrecks associated with the Bermuda Triangle that have aired on The Discovery Channel, National Geographic, History Channel, and The Learning Channel.

Shipwreck identification
Barnette has been active in the identification of numerous shipwrecks that include:
 The steamer Arratoon Apcar
 The yacht Esmeralda
 The tug Gwalia
 The tanker Joseph M Cudhay
 The steamer Leif Eriksson
 The tanker Munger T. Ball
 The luxury yacht Nohab (ex Lensahn (III))
 The tanker Papoose
 The steamer Peconic
 The tug Point Chicot
 The Queen of Nassau
 The tanker San Delfino
 The schooner barge Vitric
 The freighter Cotopaxi
 U.S. Coast Guard Albatross #1240
 The tanker W.E. Hutton
 The steamer Valley City
 The paddle steamer Idaho
 The steamer Munisla
 The freighter Holstein
 The tanker Pan Massachusetts
 The sailboat Kringeline
 The freighter Sandra

Publications

Books

Articles

See also
 USS Narcissus (1863)
 Oculina varicosa

References

External links
 Association of Underwater Explorers
 Barnette's photography

1971 births
Living people
American non-fiction writers
American underwater divers
People from Fredericksburg, Virginia
Fellows of the Explorers Club